The Hôtel de Hanau, also known as the Hôtel de ville and (in German) as the Hanauer Hof, is a historic building located on Place Broglie on the Grande Île in the city center of Strasbourg, in the French department of the Bas-Rhin. It has been classified as a Monument historique since 1921.

History
The Hôtel de Hanau stands on a site originally owned by the rulers of Hanau-Lichtenberg, a county of the Holy Roman Empire. The current building, a typical  hôtel particulier with a grand portal, a grand courtyard and two ornate façades, was commissioned by Johann Reinhard III, the last Count of Hanau-Lichtenberg, in 1728. It was constructed between 1731 and 1736 by Joseph Massol, who was also the executive architect of Palais Rohan at roughly the same time. It became state-owned (bien public) in 1790 in the wake of the French Revolution.

Today the building is the Hôtel de ville or city hall for the city of Strasbourg, a role it has had since 1805 and the first visit of Napoleon, who bestowed propriety of the hôtel to the city. It is now principally used for weddings, official receptions and banquets, whilst the administration of the city and the Strasbourg Eurométropole is run from the centre administratif (also known as mairie) near Parc de l'Étoile (built 1973–76). The city hall is not open for tourists apart on special days such as European Heritage Days.

Gallery

References

External links

Hôtel de ville - place Broglie on archi-wiki.org

Literature
Recht, Roland; Foessel, Georges; Klein, Jean-Pierre: Connaître Strasbourg, 1988, pages 116–119

See also
Hôtel des Deux-Ponts
Hôtel de Klinglin
Hôtel du grand doyenné

18th-century architecture
Monuments historiques of Strasbourg
Buildings and structures completed in 1736
Baroque buildings in France
Hôtels particuliers in Strasbourg
1736 establishments in Europe
Strasbourg
18th-century architecture in France